Akkara Paha (Sinhala, Five Acres of Land) is a 1970 Sri Lankan drama film directed by Dr. Lester James Peries, with the screen play dialogue and script by Dr. Tissa Abeysekara. The film stars Milton Jayawardena as Sena, a young man from a rural society who travels to the city to pursue a higher education and Malini Fonseka as Kumari.

Tissa Abeysekera adapted Madawela S. Ratnayake's book as a follow-up to Golu Hadawatha. The film received a lukewarm response in Sri Lanka, but was well received when shown in New York at the Museum of Modern Art's festival.

Plot
Sena (Milton Jayawardena) is sent to a boarding school at a well-to-do city university by his family who mortgage everything they own to pay for his education. Their future well-being is thus in the hands of Sena. Sena however succumbs to the temptations of city life and fails in his venture.

The impoverished family takes on the titular scheme offered by the government to settle the North Central province.

Cast
 Milton Jayawardena as Sena Medawatta
 Janaki Kurukulasuriya as Theresa Perera
 Malini Fonseka as Kumari 'Akka'
 Anoma Wattaladeniya as Sandhawathie 'Sandha'
 Gamini Wijesuriya as Banda Medawatta 'Thaththa'
 Shanthi Lekha as Sena's Amma
 Douglas Ranasinghe as Samarasena 'Samarey'
 Sriyani Perera as Sujatha Gajanayake
 Shirani Kurukulasuriya as Leena Perera
 Ruby de Mel as Mrs. Perera 'Mamma'
 Basil de Saram as Ranjith Perera
 Seetha Kumari as Sandha's Amma
 Amarasiri Kalansuriya as Gunapala
 Wijeratne Warakagoda as Teacher
 Mapa Gunaratne as Loku Iskola Mahattaya
 Lionel Deraniyagala as Doctor

References

External links
 Sri Lanka Cinema Database
 

1969 films
Films directed by Lester James Peries
Films set in Sri Lanka (1948–present)
1969 drama films
Sri Lankan drama films